Tradition teaches that Saint Phosterius the Hermit dwelt on a high mountain most likely in the wilderness of modern-day Turkey. He is commemorated on January 5/18. 

He is said to have been fed by an angel which serves as a testament to his holiness.

Phosterius gained renown amongst his contemporaries during the Iconoclastic Controversy in the seventh century.  Due to the testimony to the truth of the Christian faith given by the witness of his holy life many people left the heresy of Iconoclasm.

Saint Phosterius is commemorated 5 January in the Eastern Orthodox and Byzantine Catholic Churches.

See also
Christian monasticism
Stylites

References

External links
Orthodox Church in America

Byzantine hermits
7th-century Christian saints
7th-century Byzantine people
Byzantine saints
Saints from Anatolia